Florencia "Flor" Caserta (born April 13, 1984) is an Argentine female pop and rock singer.

Biography
Caserta was born in El Palomar, Buenos Aires. She met Pablo Romero, singer of the band , who heard her singing and invited her to make a disc of covers from different bands from El Oeste (the western zone of Greater Buenos Aires). It was there that she recorded her first song, “Mañana en el Abasto”, by Sumo.

After that, they proposed that she record some demos of pop music. The process lasted two years, until they obtained five songs which they presented to producer Gustavo Santaolalla.

Discography

Flor's first album is the self-titled Flor (2006). Tracks include:

"La Respuesta" (The Answer)
"No, nada" (No, nothing)
"Aire" (Air)
"Igual" (Same One)
"Sal" (Get Out)
"Girar" (To Turn)
"Así" (Like This)
"¿Qué será?" (What Will Be?)
"Jazmín"

"Jazmín" was the album's first single. "La Respuesta" was its second single.

Charts

Production
Pablo Romero, Gustavo Santaolalla, Adrián Sosa. Associated Producer: Aníbal Kerpel.

The album was recorded in Los Angeles, California by Aníbal Kerpel. Mixed in "La Casa" studies in Los Angeles.

See also
Mononymous persons

External links
 Official website
Biography of Flor
Flor, the "Argentine rock princess"
Article about Flor  in Clarín Journal
Flor in Página 12
Flor, nominated at two Gardel Awards
Flor, nominated at the MTV Video Music Awards Latin America as Best New Act (South)

1984 births
Living people
21st-century Argentine women singers
Women rock singers
People from Morón Partido